Catholic Education, an Irish Schools Trust (CEIST) is the trustee body for 107 Catholic Voluntary Secondary Schools in Ireland.

History
In Ireland, the majority of secondary schools were established and were controlled by a number of Roman Catholic religious congregations. By the late 20th century, these congregations were in serious decline and they decided to merge their resources in a number of collective school management groupings known as trusts.

The CEIST was established in 2007 to carry on the education work of five religious congregations: 
 Daughters of Charity
 Presentation Sisters
 Sisters of the Christian Retreat 
 Sisters of Mercy
 Missionaries of the Sacred Heart.

Organisation
CEIST CLG was incorporated in May 2007. The religious congregations appointed 16 CEIST members - 11 religious and five lay. The board of directors has 12 members - three religious and nine lay.

Day-to-day management remains the responsibility of each school's management, in accord with the Education Act 1998. The schools are supported by the trustees from the central office.

It currently oversees approximately 58,000 students and 4,000 teachers and administrative staff. Currently, one in six second level students in Ireland attends a CEIST secondary school.

Schools

Assessment
A recent review of its development over the past ten years identified certain strengths and weaknesses. There continues to be debate about state-sponsored denominational education in Ireland.

See also
Denominational education in the Republic of Ireland

References

Educational organisations based in the Republic of Ireland